The 1956 Humboldt State Lumberjacks football team represented Humboldt State College during the 1956 NCAA College Division football season. Humboldt State competed in the Far Western Conference (FWC).

The 1956 Lumberjacks were led by sixth-year head coach Phil Sarboe. They played home games at the Redwood Bowl in Arcata, California. Humboldt State finished in a three-way tie for the conference championship, with a record of nine wins and two losses (9–2, 4–1 FWC). The Lumberjacks outscored their opponents 269–149 for the season.

Schedule

Notes

References

Humboldt State
Humboldt State Lumberjacks football seasons
Northern California Athletic Conference football champion seasons
Humboldt State Lumberjacks football